The Minister of State in the Prime Minister's Office is a non-cabinet ministerial position in the government of Zimbabwe. The incumbent is Gordon Moyo. The duties of the position have yet to be publicly defined, although Prime Minister Morgan Tsvangirai has indicated it will include responsibility for student affairs.

References

Government of Zimbabwe